310th Sustainment Command (Expeditionary) (ESC) is an Army Reserve unit subordinate to 377th Theater Sustainment Command headquartered in Indianapolis, Indiana.  The command provides command and control for sustainment units through Indiana, Kentucky, Ohio, West Virginia, Virginia, and North Carolina. 310th ESC provides trained and ready sustainment forces in support of global contingency operations.

Mission 
On order, 310th ESC is prepared to deploy and provide command and control to all assigned and attached units and to provide sustainment planning, guidance and support to forces in an area of operations.

Mobilizations & Deployments

Subordinate Units 

Sustainment Commands of the United States Army